The USS Enterprise NCC-1701-E (or Enterprise-E, to distinguish it from prior and later starships with the same name) is a fictional starship belonging to the United Federation of Planets, commonly known as the Federation, in the Star Trek franchise. It appears in the films Star Trek: First Contact, Star Trek: Insurrection and Star Trek: Nemesis, where it serves as the primary setting. It is the sixth Federation starship to carry the name "Enterprise". The ship's captain during the 2370s and early 2380s was Jean-Luc Picard. He was transferred to the Enterprise-E after the Enterprise-D was destroyed in The Next Generation spin-off movie Star Trek Generations.

Origin and design 
Ronald D. Moore, the co-writer of Star Trek Generations and Star Trek: First Contact, has suggested that construction of the Enterprise-E began during the final season of The Next Generation (2370), and that the ship was renamed USS Enterprise, which would become the next flagship of the United Federation of Planets after the Enterprise-D had been destroyed.

Depiction 
The Enterprise-E is a Sovereign class starship, launched in 2372 from the San Francisco Fleet Yards under the command of Captain Jean-Luc Picard, and most of the key officers from the Enterprise-D.  According to the non-canon novel Ship of the Line, the originally planned name for the vessel was USS Honorius, and Montgomery Scott was part of the team of engineers that designed the Enterprise-E.

In the film Star Trek: First Contact, the Enterprise participates in the Battle of Sector 001, a Borg attack directly on Earth, the capital of the Federation, using a Borg Cube. Picard's haunting memories of his former experience as a Borg drone in The Next Generation granted him knowledge on a vulnerable spot on the seemingly-indestructible cube, which he passed on to the other participating Federation ships and they subsequently attacked the spot and destroyed the cube. The Borg cube launches a smaller vessel prior to its destruction, which travels back in time in an attempt to stop Zefram Cochrane's first contact with the Vulcans, thus preventing the Federation from ever being formed, although the Enterprise crew are as yet unaware of this plan as they follow the vessel into the temporal vortex it had created to travel through time. The Enterprise's crew briefly glimpse the result of the creation of this alternate history while following the vessel back through time; the attack is successful and Earth is wholly assimilated by the Borg. 

Once the Enterprise arrives over Earth shortly after the Borg vessel, the vessel quickly targets a particular spot on Earth and attacks, but the Enterprise manages to destroy it before it does any serious damage. After the attack, the Enterprise crew determine that they have arrived in the year 2063, the year humanity made first contact with the Vulcans, and they also determine that the Borg vessel's target was Bozeman, Montana, the launch site of Cochrane's first faster-than-light flight. This leads to the crew now realizing that the Borg's reason for time-travelling was to stop the first contact event and they decide to covertly assist Cochrane in his preparations in a bid to ensure the flight happens as intended and history remains intact.  

However, the crew are unaware that some of the Borg had teleported to the Enterprise before their vessel was destroyed. The Borg proceed to hijack and almost assimilate the entire ship until Captain Picard and Commander Data reclaim it and rescue the crew. After that, the crew witness Cochrane's flight and humanity's successful first contact, then Commander Geordi La Forge, the ship's Chief Engineer, informs Picard that he has found a way to replicate the Borg's temporal vortex and return to their own time in the 24th century, which he successfully accomplishes and the film ends as the Enterprise travels into the vortex back to the future. 

In Star Trek: Insurrection, the crew stops a Son'a attempt to forcibly relocate the Ba'ku people from their homeworld. In Star Trek: Nemesis, the Enterprise is heavily damaged while stopping Shinzon from using a weapon of mass destruction to destroy all life on Earth. The ship returns to spacedock to undergo extensive repairs.

In the novels published by Pocket Books after Nemesis, the Enterprise-E remains under the command of Picard as of 2385 in the 2013 novel miniseries Star Trek: The Fall. Data was resurrected in the novels similarly to the comic miniseries Countdown, but he decided not to re-enter Starfleet.

A designer's blueprints show that the Enterprise has new phaser banks and torpedo launchers in Star Trek: Nemesis that were not present in Star Trek: Insurrection. It also shows the warp nacelles have been moved upwards and forward slightly. Star Trek: Ships of the Line, written by Star Treks technical consultant Michael Okuda, states that the Enterprise can travel at up to warp 9.995.

Ship's officers 
Captain Jean-Luc Picard, captain of the Enterprise from the ship's launch in 2372.
Commander William Thomas Riker (executive officer), first officer of the Enterprise from its launch in 2372. Later promoted to captain in 2379 and transferred with his wife, ship's counselor Commander Deanna Troi, to take command of the USS Titan.
Lieutenant Commander Data (operations officer), an android who serves as operations officer from its launch in 2372, and was third in line of command, until his death in 2379, at the end of Star Trek: Nemesis.
Commander Deanna Troi (ship's counselor), Commander Troi was the ship's counselor from its launch in 2372, until the end of Star Trek: Nemesis, when she departed with her new husband, Captain Riker, for the Titan.
Lieutenant Commander Worf (head of security / weapons officer), serving as strategic operations officer on Deep Space Nine during the Dominion War, Worf was made an ambassador to Qo'noS, but eventually returned to Starfleet by the time of the film Star Trek: Nemesis.  Following Riker's departure at the end of that film, Worf was promoted to commander and first officer in the non-canon 2007 novel Resistance, and continues to serve in this role in the Destiny, Typhon Pact, and The Fall novels. When Picard took command of the USS Verity, Worf is appointed as captain of the Enterprise-E in the "Star Trek: Picard" non-canon novel The Last Best Hope.
Commander Beverly Crusher, MD (chief medical officer), the ship's chief medical officer from its launch in 2372. In the non-canon 2007 novel Death in Winter, she again took a position as head of Starfleet Medical, but returned to the Enterprise in the novel Resistance, and has since married Captain Picard.
Lieutenant Commander Geordi La Forge, chief engineer from the ship's acceptance into Starfleet service.
Lieutenant Reginald Barclay (diagnostics technician), present during the events of Star Trek: First Contact.
Lieutenant Hawk (helmsman), flight controller until assimilation by the Borg and death at the hands of Worf in Star Trek: First Contact.

Reception 
In 2018, Io9/Gizmodo ranked the fictional spacecraft design shown in the films First Contact, Insurrection, and Nemesis, the Enterprise-E, as the third best version of starship Enterprise of the Star Trek franchise.

In 2019, SyFy ranked the fictional starship design, the NCC-1701-E Enterprise as the third best version of the starship in the Star Trek science fiction universe.

References

External links 

Enterprise-E
Star Trek: The Next Generation
Fictional elements introduced in 1996